The Mingxin baojian is an ancient Chinese book containing "a collection of aphorisms and quotations form the Chinese classics and other works" The author and date of authorship are not reliably known, although later references suggest that it was compiled in 1393 by Fan Liben. The quotations and aphorisms in the book appear to be from scholarly writings of Confucianism, Buddhism, and Taoism, with "a great many of the quotations... taken from Taoist writings", suggesting that the author was a follower of Taoism. 

The Mingxin baojian was the first book  translated from Chinese into a Western language. "The Ming-hsin pao-chien seems to have widely circulated among the people in Fukien in the late Ming period. It was brought by the Chinese to the Philippines". It was translated into Spanish by a Dominican friar named Juan Cobo who arrived in the Philippines in 1588. In 1595, the Dominicans presented this translation, along with a copy of the original, to Philip III of Spain, then Crown Prince. Prior to its acquisition by westerners, the work had already been translated and circulated in other Asian countries. It is known as the Myeongsim Bogam in Korean, and the Minh tâm bửu giám Vietnamese. It was included in The Chinese Repository, translated by William Milne.

See also 

 Naehun

References

14th-century books
Chinese literary works
Taoist texts
Books of quotations
Books of aphorisms